The New Hope (NN), previously known as Confederation for the Renewal of the Republic Liberty and Hope (KORWiN/Liberty), is a right-wing populist political party in Poland. It is currently led by Sławomir Mentzen.

It was founded in 2015 by Korwin-Mikke as a result of his removal from Congress of the New Right, his former party. Among the party's other members are Przemysław Wipler, who held a seat in the Polish Sejm and Robert Iwaszkiewicz, Member of the European Parliament. The party's Polish name was originally a backronym of the founder's name Korwin-Mikke, who took part in the 2015 presidential election.

In 2018, the party formed a coalition with National Movement called Confederation. The party have currently three members in the Sejm.

History  
The party was formed shortly after Janusz Korwin-Mikke was removed from the chairmanship of the Congress of the New Right (KNP). The pro-Korwin faction of the KNP ended up forming the KORWiN party ahead of the 2015 Polish presidential election. Janusz Korwin-Mikke finished fourth in that election, earning 3.26% of the vote (486,084 votes). In the 2015 Polish parliamentary election the party earned 4.76% of the vote (722,999 votes) but it failed to reach the 5% electoral threshold needed to get any seats.

The party gained two seats during the VIII Sejm after Jacek Wilk and later Jakub Kulesza left Kukiz'15 to join KORWiN.

Ahead of the 2019 European Parliament election in Poland, KORWiN formed an alliance with the National Movement (RN) and other right-wing parties called the Confederation. The coalition failed to get any seats however the main parties stayed together to contest the 2019 Polish parliamentary election. The Confederation ended up receiving 6.81% of the vote (1,256,953 votes) and 11 seats. KORWiN got five of those seats.

For the 2020 Polish presidential election KORWiN endorsed vice-chairman of the RN Krzysztof Bosak, after he won the 2019–20 Confederation presidential primary. Bosak received 6.8% of the vote (1,317,380) which was by far the best result of any candidate (or party) endorsed by Janusz Korwin-Mikke. In 2022 three MP's from KORWiN left the party, creating a new one called Wolnościowcy.

Ideology and position 
The New Hope has been described as a right-wing and far-right party. It has been ideologically described as libertarian-conservative, libertarian, and conservative-liberal. It supports lowering taxes and implementing radical privatisation, while regarding social issues, the party is conservative. It has been also described as right-wing populist. It supports the re-establishment of the monarchy, and has expressed hard Eurosceptic rhetoric towards the European Union.

Programme 
The party's programme preamble calls for:
 rebuilding the basic values of the Polish culture and "Latin civilization" and the Christian moral foundations of society,
 construction of rule of law, fair and efficient governance based on the subsidiarity principle,
 implementation of the "eternal human aspirations for Freedom",
 respect for the private property of citizens and the fruits of their labor,
 striving for the implementation of the Polish national interest in the international arena and optimal conditions for the development of the Republic of Poland,
 strengthening the role of the family and creating favorable conditions for its development.

Other issues mentioned in the program are: 
 the adoption of a new Polish constitution which takes into account the "principle of no harm to the will" and the introduction of a presidential system; strengthening the tripartite division of powers by prohibiting the combination of positions in the legislative, executive and judiciary (especially the functions of a deputy and minister);
 the reduction of the role of the Sejm to the body deciding on the amount of taxes and controlling the executive power, and the reduction of the number of ministries;
 the creation of an eleven-person Council of State elected by the Senate and appointed by the President. According to the group's leader, it would take over the legislative initiative from the government 
 elimination of PIT and CIT income taxes as well as inheritance and donation tax, as well as the abolition of compulsory pension and health insurance while respecting acquired rights;
 introducing in the constitution a ban on adopting a budget with a deficit in peacetime; regaining sovereignty which, according to the party, requires abandoning the Treaty of Lisbon and rebuilding the treaty base of the European Union; 
 halving defense spending;
 reintroduction of the death penalty.

Election results

Sejm

Presidential

References

External links
  

2015 establishments in Poland
Anarcho-capitalist organizations
Eurosceptic parties in Poland
Capital punishment in Poland
Conservative parties in Poland
Libertarian conservative parties
Libertarianism in Europe
Political parties established in 2015
Political parties in Poland
Paleolibertarianism
Right-wing parties in Europe
Far-right political parties in Poland
Monarchism
Confederation Liberty and Independence